Wilkiea huegeliana is a common small tree of rainforest in eastern Australia. Common names include common wilkiea, tetra beech, and veiny wilkiea. Originally described by French naturalist Louis René Tulasne, it was given its current name by Alphonse Pyramus de Candolle.

The natural distribution is from Mount Dromedary (36° S) near Narooma in south eastern New South Wales to Maryborough (25° S) in south eastern Queensland. It has a preference for volcanic soils.

The habitat of the common wilkiea is in the understorey of all forms or rainforest, except cool temperate forest subject to colder temperatures.

Description 

The trunk is often crooked and irregular though not buttressed. The bark is smooth, brown or greyish, though can be somewhat scaly on larger plants.

Elliptic or oblong in shape, they usually have toothed margins, though rarely entire. Rounded at the top, tapering at the stem end of the leaf. Dark and glossy above the leaf, dull and paler underneath. The leaf stalks are 3 to 11 mm long, and are very heavily and noticeably veined, particularly below the leaf.

A dioecious species, the plants are either male or female. The yellow green fragrant flowers form from September to February.

Fruit matures from May to September. The fruiting receptacle is shiny black in colour, 7 to 12 mm in diameter, without a stalk. Several of them sit together on a tubular disk. Regeneration is from fresh seeds that stand out white on the darker forest floor, after having been dropped by birds.

Wilkiea huegeliana is most likely pollinated by Thrips setipennis, a species of thrips. These insects have been found in both male and female flowers.

References 

Monimiaceae
Laurales of Australia
Trees of Australia
Flora of New South Wales
Flora of Queensland